Rebecca Haffajee is an American lawyer and public health researcher who is the nominee to serve as assistant secretary of health and human services for planning and evaluation. She has served in the role in an acting capacity since March 2021.

Early life and education 
Haffajee was raised in Massachusetts. She earned a Bachelor of Arts degree in women's studies and health policy from Duke University, a Juris Doctor from Harvard Law School, a Master of public health from the Harvard T.H. Chan School of Public Health, and PhD in health policy from Harvard University.

Career 
Haffajee worked as a policy researcher at the RAND Corporation and an assistant professor at the University of Michigan School of Public Health. She also practice health law at Ropes & Gray and was a legal fellow at the Georgetown University Law Center.

References 

Living people
Duke University alumni
Harvard Law School alumni
Harvard School of Public Health alumni
RAND Corporation people
University of Michigan faculty
Georgetown University Law Center alumni
United States Department of Health and Human Services officials
Year of birth missing (living people)